MŠK - Thermál Veľký Meder is a Slovak association football club located in Veľký Meder. It currently plays in Slovak IV. liga south-east.

Colors and badge 
Its colors are green and white.

Notable players 
Had international caps for their respective countries. Players whose name is listed in bold represented their countries while playing for Thermál.

 István Ferenczi
 Peter Lérant
 Siradji Sani

References

External links
Veľký Meder website 

Football clubs in Slovakia